Prince Nguyễn Phúc Bảo Thăng (30 September 1944 – 15 March 2017) was the son of Emperor Bảo Đại and Empress Nam Phương of Vietnam. He succeeded as head of the  House of Vietnam following the death of his brother, Bảo Long, on 28 July 2007.

Education
He attended the schools of Couvent des Oiseaux in Neuilly-sur-Seine, France, and Collège d'Adran, in Da Lat in the Central Highlands of Vietnam. Bảo Thăng resided in exile in France.

Honours
 Knight Grand Collar of the Order of the Eagle of Georgia (Royal House of Georgia).

Ancestry

References 

1944 births
2017 deaths
People from Da Lat
Vietnamese Roman Catholics
Nguyen dynasty princes
Pretenders to the Vietnamese throne
Vietnamese expatriates in France
Vietnamese monarchists
Vietnamese anti-communists